
Year 258 BC was a year of the pre-Julian Roman calendar. At the time it was known as the Year of the Consulship of Calatinus and Peterculus (or, less frequently, year 496 Ab urbe condita). The denomination 258 BC for this year has been used since the early medieval period, when the Anno Domini calendar era became the prevalent method in Europe for naming years.

Events 
 By place 

 Roman Republic 
 The Romans are able to regain the initiative in Sicily against Carthage by retaking Enna and Camarina. In central Sicily, they take the town of Mytistraton, which they have attacked twice previously. The Romans also move in the north by marching across the northern coast toward Panormus, but are not able to take the city due to the city's heavily fortified walls.
 Gaius Duilius Nepos, the  Roman commander who has won a major naval victory over the Carthaginians is made censor with Lucius Cornelius Scipio. The election of a novus homo (i.e. the first in his family to serve in the Roman Senate or be elected as consul) to the censorship is a very rare honor.

 Egypt 
 Ptolemy II loses control of the territory of Cyrenaica.
 Erasistratus of Ceos founds a medical school at Alexandria.

 Greece 
 The forces of the Macedonian King Antigonus II and the Seleucid King Antiochus II win a naval victory at Cos against their common enemy, Ptolemy II. This victory secures Antigonus control over the Aegean Sea and the League of the Islanders. It also diminishes Ptolemaic naval power.

China
 The State of Qin besieges Handan, the capital of the State of Zhou, but the Qin army under Wang Ling sustains heavy casualties. Wang Ling is then replaced by Wang He.
 The merchant Lu Buwei rescues the Qin prince Ying Yiren, a hostage at the Zhao court, from Handan. Ying Yiren will eventually become King Zhuangxiang of Qin.

 Vietnam 
 According to legend, the Hồng Bàng dynasty comes to an end.

Births

Deaths

References